This comparison of free software for audio lists notable free and open source software for use by sound engineers, audio producers, and those involved in sound recording and reproduction.

Players

Audio analysis

Converters

DJ software

Distributions and other platforms 
Various projects have formed to integrate the existing free software audio packages.

Modular systems

Notation

Programming languages

Many computer music programming languages are implemented in free software. See also the comparison of audio synthesis environments.

Radio broadcasting

See also streaming below.

Recording and editing

The following packages are digital audio editors.

Softsynths

Streaming
These programs are for use with streaming audio.

Technologies

Trackers
These music sequencer programs allow users to arrange notes (pitch-shifted sound samples) on a timeline: see tracker (music software).

Other

See also

 ABC notation
 List of Linux audio software

References

Audio software